Gerlach III of Isenburg-Covern was the Count of Isenburg-Covern from 1217 until 1235.

1235 deaths
House of Isenburg
Year of birth unknown